"Party All the Time" is a song by comedian and actor Eddie Murphy, written and produced by Rick James. It was the lead single from Murphy's 1985 debut musical album How Could It Be. It reached number two on the Billboard Hot 100 for three weeks, behind "Say You, Say Me" by Lionel Richie.

Production 
Murphy stated that the song was made in response to a $100,000 bet made between himself and actor/comedian Richard Pryor, wagering on whether Murphy had singing talent or not. The single was recorded at Rick James's home studio in Buffalo, New York. In addition to his duties as the song's writer and producer, James also provided backup vocals.

Reception 
A reader in the Los Angeles Times, Barbara Bryson, criticized the song, characterizing it as "Gumby goes disco" (referring to the character parodied by Murphy on Saturday Night Live). The publication also placed the song at number one on "The Video Bottom 10" list. Meanwhile, critic Scott Benarde in the Ft. Lauderdale Sun-Sentinel awarded the song his worst single for 1985, calling it a "catchy uptempo dance number" but asserting that "Murphy adds nothing but his ego to it.  His voice is paper thin and buried in the mix.  Anyone could have sung that tune the way it was produced. Murphy should stick to imitating Gumby."

The song's music video won best urban contemporary video award at the American Video Awards in November 1985.

Personnel 

 Eddie Murphy – lead vocal
 Rick James – drums, percussion, backing vocals, production
 Kenny Hawkins – guitar
 Greg Levias – keyboards
 Levi Ruffin – keyboards, backing vocals
 LaMorris Payne – backing vocals

Charts

Weekly charts

Year-end charts

Certifications

Remixes and covers
In 2006, house DJ and producer Sharam Tayebi of Deep Dish released a remix of the song, known simply as "PATT" (an acronym for "Party All the Time"), which peaked at No. 8 on the UK Singles Chart on December 30, 2006 and at No. 4 on the Polish Airplay Chart in early 2007. The song also peaked at number 87 on the Australian ARIA Charts.

Finnish band Children of Bodom covered the song in 2011, as a bonus track on the Japanese edition of their album Relentless Reckless Forever.

In 2014, Gwyneth Paltrow covered the song in the Glee season 5 episode "New Directions".

Finnish stoner rock band Mangoo also covered the song on their 2017 album The Heat.

Guitarist Eric Calderone covered the song in 2022 on his YouTube channel.

References

1985 singles
Eddie Murphy songs
Songs written by Rick James
1985 songs
Columbia Records singles
Song recordings produced by Rick James
American funk songs
American synth-pop songs